Anodus is a genus of halftooths from tropical South America.  There are currently two species in this genus.

Species
 Anodus elongatus Agassiz, 1829
 Anodus orinocensis (Steindachner, 1887)

References
 

Hemiodontidae
Characiformes genera
Taxa named by Johann Baptist von Spix
Fish of South America